Ryan Malone (born August 11, 1992) is an American professional soccer player who plays as a center-back or defensive midfielder for German club Hansa Rostock.

Career

College career 
Malone played for Springfield College from 2010 to 2015. In his first season, he made 20 appearances, scoring nine goals, but was forced to sit out the 2011 season due to an injury. After playing four seasons with Springfield, he finished his career with 66 appearances and scored 28 goals.

Professional career 
Following his collegiate career, he signed with 1. FC Magdeburg on June 1, 2015. He made his debut in a 3–0 win against VfL Osnabrück on September 15, 2015, playing for six minutes. His first goal came in a 1–0 win against Wehen Wiesbaden. At the end of the season, Magdeburg decided not to extend the contract. In manager Jens Härtel's opinion, Malone needed regular soccer to develop and the club were unable to guarantee that.

During the summer break, Malone signed a contract with Regionalliga Südwest side Stuttgarter Kickers.

On June 20, 2017, it was announced Malone had moved on from Kickers and joined 1. FC Lokomotive Leipzig on a two-year deal.

Personal life 
A Chicopee, Massachusetts, native, Malone holds a degree in Sport Management.

References

External links 
 

1992 births
Living people
American soccer players
Association football central defenders
Association football midfielders
People from Chicopee, Massachusetts
USL League Two players
2. Bundesliga players
3. Liga players
Regionalliga players
Western Mass Pioneers players
1. FC Magdeburg players
Stuttgarter Kickers players
1. FC Lokomotive Leipzig players
VfB Lübeck players
FC Hansa Rostock players
Soccer players from Massachusetts
American expatriate soccer players
American expatriate soccer players in Germany